Andrea Galasso (10 November 1932 – 12 August 2022) was an Italian politician.

Biography
A member of the Forza Italia, he served in the  Chamber of Deputies of the Republic of Italy from 1972 to 1983. 

Galasso died from COVID-19 in August 2022, aged 89.

References

1932 births
2022 deaths
Deputies of Legislature VI of Italy
Deputies of Legislature VII of Italy
Forza Italia politicians
Politicians from Naples
Deaths from the COVID-19 pandemic in Campania